Säter Municipality (Säters kommun) is one of the 290 municipalities of Sweden in Dalarna County in central Sweden. Its seat is located in the town of Säter.

The present municipality was created in 1971 with the amalgamation of the former City of Säter and two neighbouring municipalities.

Geography 
Säter is known for the Säter Valley.  It is about 5 kilometers long and has a dense vegetation and steeps.  On its bottom the Ljuster stream flows.  The valley is popular for walking.

Localities
Population centers in Säter Municipality:
 Mora
 Naglarby och Enbacka
 Säter (seat)
 Skedvi kyrkby
 Solvarbo

Riksdag elections

Sights 
The Old Church of Stora Skedvi is one of Dalarna's oldest, with its oldest parts from the 13th century.

There are several remains from the province's mining history, such as the Östra Silvberg's Mining Area with a silver mining history traced to the 1480s with an adjacent cemetery and chapel. It was closed in the 19th century and the mine itself is today a water filled hole.

Bispbergs gruva was used for mining iron for over 600 years, until it was closed in 1967.

References 

  article Säter from Nordisk Familjebok (1919).

External links 

 Säter - Official site

Municipalities of Dalarna County